CBNU could stand for:

University
 Chungbuk National University, Cheongju, South Korea
 Chonbuk National University, Jeonju, South Korea